A 21-gun salute is the most commonly recognized of the customary gun salutes that are performed by the firing of cannons or artillery as a military honor. As naval customs evolved, 21 guns came to be fired for heads of state, or in exceptional circumstances for heads of government, with the number decreasing with the rank of the recipient of the honor. While the 21-gun salute is the most commonly recognized, the number of rounds fired in any given salute will vary depending on the conditions. Circumstances affecting these variations include the particular occasion and, in the case of military and state funerals, the branch of service, and rank (or office) of the person to whom honors are being rendered.

History

The custom stems from naval tradition in the sixteenth century, when a warship entering a foreign port would fire each of its cannons while still out of range of targets. Since cannons then required a considerable time to reload, the ship was effectively disarmed, signifying the lack of hostile intent. In the earliest days, seven guns was the recognized British national salute because seven was the standard number of weapons on a vessel. In those days, gunpowder made from sodium nitrate was easier to keep on dry land than at sea. The early regulations stated that although a ship would fire only seven guns, the forts ashore would fire three shots to each one shot afloat, hence the number 21.

Odd numbers were chosen, as even numbers indicated a death.

By country

Canada
The prime minister, heads of foreign missions, foreign heads of government, and the Vice President of the United States are entitled to a 19-gun salute.

A 17-gun salute is given to the Canadian Minister of National Defence when visiting a saluting station (limited to once a year), as well as foreign ministers of defence.

Before they were abolished in 1968 by the Trudeau government, royal salutes were fired in Ottawa, the provincial capitals, and Montreal and Vancouver also on the Queen's Accession Day (6 February), the Queen's actual birthday (21 April), the Queen's Coronation Day (2 June), the Birthday of the Duke of Edinburgh (10 June), and the Birthday of Queen Elizabeth the Queen Mother (4 August).

Denmark

The day after the birth of Princess Benedikte in 1944 which took place during Nazi Germany's Occupation of Denmark, members of the Danish resistance group Holger Danske performed a salute of 21 bombs in the Ørstedsparken public park in central Copenhagen as a reference to the traditional 21-gun salute performed at the occasion of royal births.

Egypt
A 21-gun salute was used during the Parade of the Pharaohs (also called the Golden Parade) on April 3, 2021, when the mummies of Ancient Egyptian pharaohs were transferred to their new museum in Giza. Most of the mummies belonged to the New Kingdom period, which ruled Egypt between 1539 BC to 1075 BC. A 21-gun salute was used during the funeral of former Egyptian president Hosni Mubarak in February 2020. A 21 gun salute was used after President Abdel Fattah el-Sisi was sworn in on 8 June 2014. A final 21-gun salute was also fired to honor King Farouk prior to his embarking on the yacht Mahrousa that brought him to exile in Italy in 1952.

France

The 21-gun salute is accorded to the French president, forming part of his "military honors" (honneurs militaires). The salute is given during the inauguration ceremony (by two 75mm guns) and during naval visits. These honors are extended to foreign heads of state during state visits.

India
During the British Raj, India developed a formal hierarchical system of gun salutes. At the time of Indian independence in 1947, the hierarchy of salutes within British India stood as follows:

Prior to Indian independence in 1947, the Viceroy of India received a unique viceregal salute of 31 guns. After 1947, the 31-gun salute was retained for honouring the Governor-General of India (1947–1950).

Indonesia

In Indonesia, the 21-gun salute is done during state visits of foreign heads of state visiting Indonesia.

The modified 17-gun salute is executed during the commemoration of the precise seconds of the proclamation of the independence of Indonesia on the 17 of August at 10:00 near the Merdeka Palace in Jakarta. It is also done in other cities in Indonesia during the independence day commemoration ceremonies. See the 17-gun salute in Indonesia here: Indonesian Independence Day 17-gun salute

Israel
In Israel the practice of gun salute has been eliminated due to the country having "suffered many terror attacks".

Singapore
A 21-gun salute is carried out for National Day Parades in Singapore by the Singapore Artillery during the presidential inspection of parade contingents.

In a rare occurrence, the 21-gun salute was given to the former Prime Minister and founding leader Lee Kuan Yew during his state funeral.

Sri Lanka
Traditionally, the Sri Lanka Navy accords a 25-gun salute to the nation on the National day, which is 4 February each year. The salute is fired from the ceremonial naval gun battery at Colombo Lighthouse - a tradition inherited from prior British influence. It began with HMCyS Vijaya of the Royal Ceylon Navy, the first warship of the navy according a 25-gun salute on 4 February 1951 with its single 4-inch gun.

United Kingdom

The number of rounds fired in a salute depends on the place and occasion. The basic salute is 21 rounds. In Hyde Park and Green Park an extra 20 rounds are added because they are Royal Parks. At the Tower of London 62 rounds are fired on royal anniversaries (the basic 21, plus a further 20 because the Tower is a Royal Palace and Fortress, plus another 21 'for the City of London') and 41 on other occasions. The Tower of London probably holds the record for the most rounds fired in a single salute – 124 were fired when the Duke of Edinburgh's birthday (62 rounds) coincided with the Saturday designated as the Queen's official birthday (also 62 rounds).

On 10 April 2021, a 41-gun salute was fired to mark the death of Prince Philip, Duke of Edinburgh, with the timing changed from 1 round every 10 seconds to 1 round every minute, resulting in a total duration of 41 minutes for the salute.
When Queen Elizabeth II died, a 96-gun salute was fired to represent the years of Her Majesty's life.

Authorized military saluting stations are: 

in England:
Hyde Park, London
The Tower of London 
Royal Arsenal, Woolwich 
York Museum Gardens
The Army station in Colchester
Royal Artillery Barracks, Larkhill 
Royal Citadel, Plymouth
Dover Castle
His Majesty's Naval Base, Portsmouth

in Scotland: 
Edinburgh Castle 
Stirling Castle 
in Wales: 
Cardiff 
in Northern Ireland:
Hillsborough Castle 
Salutes are also fired in Gibraltar.

United States
The practice of firing one gun for each state in the union was not officially authorized until 1810, when the United States Department of War declared the number of rounds fired in the "National Salute" to be equivalent to the number of states, which at the time was 17. The tradition continued until 1841 when it was reduced from 26 to 21.

In 1842, the United States declared the 21-gun salute as its "Presidential Salute". While the "National Salute" had been formally established as the 21-gun salute, the current tradition holds the salute on Independence Day to be a 50 rounds—one round for each state in the union. This 'Salute to the Nation' is fired at noon on 4 July, on U.S. military installations. The U.S. Navy recognizes Presidents' Day and Memorial Day with a 21-gun salute at 1200.

In April 1914, during the Mexican Revolution, the Tampico Affair occurred, and escalated as a result of a twenty-one gun salute (or more specifically, the lack of one). Nine unarmed U.S. sailors were arrested in Tampico, Tamaulipas, Mexico, for entering an off-limit area at a fuel loading station. Despite them being released, the U.S. Naval commander demanded an apology and a twenty-one gun salute. The apology was provided, but not the salute, giving President Woodrow Wilson reason to order the U.S. occupation of the port of Veracruz.
The gun salutes fired in the United States are as follows:

Deaths of presidents

A U.S. presidential death also involves 21-gun salutes and other military traditions. On the day after the death of the president, a former president or president-elect—unless this day falls on a Sunday or holiday, in which case the honor will be rendered the following day—the commanders of Army installations with the necessary personnel and material traditionally order that one gun be fired every half-hour, beginning at reveille and ending at retreat.

On the day of burial, a 21-minute gun salute traditionally is fired starting at noon at all military installations with the necessary personnel and material. Guns will be fired at one-minute intervals. Also on the day of burial, those installations will fire a 50-gun salute—one round for each state—at five-second intervals immediately following lowering of the flag.

Media

Cultural references
The title of the Green Day song "21 Guns" is a reference to a 21-gun salute.

In the song "For Those About to Rock (We Salute You)" by AC/DC, 21-gun salutes are mentioned, including the use of Napoleonic cannons.

In the animated tv-series Archer, his fictional father "Blackjack" is given a 21-gun salute by a group of ROTC students who were donated $600 by his mother Malory Archer.

The song "Move Now" by Nonpoint also includes a reference.

In the film Chitty Chitty Bang Bang, when the Grandfather sings "Posh" whilst dangling from a hot air balloon, there is a line "they 21 gun salute me".

Boston-based Celtic punk band Dropkick Murphys recorded the song "21 Guitar Salute" (originally by The Press) on their 2002 split EP Face to Face vs. Dropkick Murphys.

The 21-gun salute are also mentioned in the song "Methods to your Madness" by heavy metal band Metal Church.

Another mention is in the Clutch song "The Mob Goes Wild".

British grime artist Stormzy included a song titled "21 Gun Salute" on his debut album Gang Signs & Prayer.

The 2000 U.S. Open Golf Championship, held at the famed Pebble Beach Golf Links, saw a unique twist on the 21-gun salute. The tournament's defending champion, Payne Stewart, had died in a plane crash the previous October. Before the tournament began, a ceremony was held in Stewart's memory in which 21 golfers lined up on the 18th fairway and hit drives into the Pacific Ocean.

In the C. S. Forester novel The Happy Return, the megalomaniacal rebel leader El Supremo demands to be honoured with a 23-gun salute. When informed that even a king only receives a 21-gun salute, he declares this is why he deserves a greater one.

In Despicable Me 2, the Minions perform a “21 fart-gun salute” to honor the departing Doctor Nefario, although it was actually a three-volley salute.

See also
Celebratory gunfire
Near-shore salute – custom of bringing a ship close to shore to "salute" those on land
Three-volley salute
Ten-bell salute

References

External links

Navy Regulations, 1990, Ch 12, Flags, Pennants, Honors, Ceremonies and Customs
AR 600-25 Salutes, Honors, and Visits of Courtesy
Origins of the 21-gun salute at the United States Army Center of Military History
The 21-Gun International Salute
Urban Legend re: Sum of Digits of 1776
Honours and salutes – Department of Canadian Heritage

Acknowledgements of death
Military life
Military traditions
Salutes
Articles containing video clips
Military ceremonies
Heads of state
State ritual and ceremonies